The 1998 Wellington City mayoral election was part of the New Zealand local elections held that same year. In 1998, elections were held for the Mayor of Wellington plus other local government positions including 18 councillors. The polling was conducted using the standard first-past-the-post electoral method.

Background
The election saw incumbent Mayor Mark Blumsky re-elected with a greatly increased majority. However Blumsky did not gain a majority of support on the council with only seven of the "Wellington Alive" ticket elected. Wellington Alive were selection of right-leaning council candidates that were given public endorsement by Blumsky following the dissolution of the decades old Citizens' Association several years earlier.

Councillor Jack Ruben initially declared to stand, but withdrew to support Stephanie Cook and avoid further splitting the left-wing vote. Bryan Pepperell, another left leaning candidate stood as well. Cook and Pepperell were re-elected to the council, though Ruben lost his seat.

The 1998 election is the last mayoral election in Wellington's history to date where the successful candidate polled more than half the popular vote. It was also the first time since the 1933 election that the Labour Party did not field a mayoral candidate.

Mayoralty results
The following table gives the election results:

Ward results

Candidates were also elected from wards to the Wellington City Council.

References

Mayoral elections in Wellington
1998 elections in New Zealand
Politics of the Wellington Region
1990s in Wellington